was the sixth of nine post stations along the Minoji. It is located in the present-day city of Ichinomiya, Aichi Prefecture, Japan. Established on edge of the Kiso River, the post station was also on the border of Mino and Owari provinces.

History
When the Joseon missions were traveling through Okoshi-juku, 270 boats were used to create a pontoon bridge  meters long.

The ruins of the post station's honjin can still be seen. The honjins eleventh manager, Katō Isotari (加藤磯足), was a student of the famed scholar Motoori Norinaga.

Neighboring post towns
Minoji
Hagiwara-juku - Okoshi-juku' - Sunomata-juku

References

History of Aichi Prefecture